Diabolis Interium (grammatically incorrect Latin, intended to mean "Devil Within") is the third studio album by Swedish black metal band Dark Funeral, released on September 24, 2001. It was recorded and mixed between January 21 and March 2 at The Abyss Studio and was the band's last album to be released through No Fashion Records. Diabolis Interium is the first album to feature drummer Matte Modin and the only album to feature guitarist Dominion and also marked the end of vocalist Emperor Magus Caligula's role as a bassist for Dark Funeral, both studio and live. The Regain Records 2007 re-release contains a second disc consisting of the EP Teach Children to Worship Satan.

Track listing

Credits

Dark Funeral
 Emperor Magus Caligula – vocals, bass guitar
 Lord Ahriman – guitar
 Dominion – guitar
 Matte Modin – drums

Additional personnel
 Peter Tägtgren – mastering
 Michael Johansson – photography
 Daniel "Morbid" Valeriani – cover design, artwork
 Lars Szöke – studio technician

Charts

References

External links 
 

2001 albums
Dark Funeral albums
Albums produced by Peter Tägtgren